Sean Christopher Lucas (born December 8, 1983) is a retired Canadian football linebacker who played all six years of his career for the Saskatchewan Roughriders of the Canadian Football League. He was a part of Saskatchewan's Grey Cup win in 2007 and was named a CFL West All-Star in 2009. Lucas was widely regarded as the Saskatchewan player at the centre of the infamous 13th Man incident that cost the club the championship in 2009. Lucas was named in football circles as the extra player who was on the field when Montreal kicker Damon Duval missed a 43-yard field goal as time expired, seemingly giving Saskatchewan the win. But Duval got a second chance from 33 yards after the Riders were penalized for too many men. Duval converted to give Montreal a thrilling 28-27 victory. The Riders have never said who the extra man was, but video replays did show Lucas start off the field, then turn and stay on for Duval's attempt in the most heart-breaking finish in Grey Cup history.

Lucas was signed as a free agent by Saskatchewan in 2006, and he spent most of 2006 CFL season as a member of their practice roster.  He made his professional debut in the final week of the season in Edmonton against the Eskimos. He has since earned a starting spot as an outside linebacker for the Roughriders and was named a CFL West Division All-Star in 2009. In college football, he played for Tulane University.

Career statistics

Notes

External links 
 Tulane Green Wave Football Player Bio

1983 births
Living people
Players of Canadian football from Atlanta
Saskatchewan Roughriders players